Roshni Sahota is an Indian television and film actress. She is best known for her role as Surbhi Singh in Shakti - Astitva Ke Ehsaas Ki, a popular TV soap that airs on Colors TV.

Filmography

Television

Films

Web series

See also 

 List of Hindi television actresses
 List of Indian television actresses

References

External links 
 

Living people
Indian television actresses
Indian soap opera actresses
Female models from Delhi
21st-century Indian actresses
People from Delhi
Actors from Delhi
Year of birth missing (living people)